This is the discography of OPM music band Callalily.

Albums

Other albums

Singles

All singles

1 Radio-only single.
2 Single currently charting.
3 Upcoming single.

Other singles

References

 
Discographies of Filipino artists
Pop music group discographies